Ardıçlıtaş is a small village in Bozyazı district of Mersin Province, Turkey. It is situated in the Taurus Mountains to the north of Bozyazı. The population of the village was 49 as of 2012.

References

Villages in Bozyazı District